is a county-level city of Zhejiang Province, East China, it is under the administration of the prefecture-level city of Hangzhou.

History
During the Ming and Qing Dynasties, Jiande was the capital of Yanzhou Prefecture. On account of this, Jiande was often referred to as Yanzhou Fu. A transcription commonly seen in both French and English writing of the time was Yen-tcheou-fou, derived from French missionary writing.

Administrative divisions
Subdistricts:
Yangxi Subdistrict (洋溪街道), Genglou Subdistrict (更楼街道), Xin'anjiang Subdistrict (新安江街道)

Towns:
Meicheng (梅城镇), Xiaya (下涯镇), Yangcunqiao (杨村桥镇), Qiantan (乾潭镇), Sandu (三都镇), Shouchang (寿昌镇), Datong (大同镇), Hangtou (航头镇), Lijia (李家镇), Dayang (大洋镇), Lianhua (莲花镇), Daciyan (大慈岩镇)

The only township is Qintang Township (钦堂乡)

Climate

Transportation
Direct trains for freight link Jiande with Yiwu and Jinhua

See also
Xinye Village, a village in Jiande

Notes

 
County-level cities in Zhejiang
Geography of Hangzhou